Strøby Egede is a coastal town, situated on the southwestern shore of Køge Bay on the east coast of the Danish island of Zealand, 5 km southeast of Køge and 6 km east of Herfølge.  

Strøby Egede is the northernmost and most populous urban area in Stevns Municipality, with a population of 4,654 (1 January 2022).

References

External links

Weather forecast Strøby Egede, Denmark weather-atlas.com

Cities and towns in Region Zealand
Stevns Municipality